Marcus Bastiaan (born 1990) is an Australian businessman and political power broker. He is a former vice-president of the Victorian Division of the Liberal Party of Australia.

Politics 

Bastiaan joined the Liberal Party in Victoria in 2010. In 2012 he stood unsuccessfully for Bayside Council in Melbourne's inner south local government election. Bastiaan polled the third highest primary among 16 candidates and lost on preferences. Bastiaan later became chair of the party's Goldstein branch and Brighton branch. Between 2015 and 2018 Bastiaan was elected to the Liberal Party's Administrative Committee and served as Chairman of the Party's Membership and Training Committee.

He has been seen by some as a protégé of former Victorian state Liberal president and fellow Liberal powerbroker Michael Kroger, who resigned from his leadership position on November 30, 2018, following the landslide re-election of the Andrews Labor Government in the October 2018 Victorian elections.

In 2017, Four Corners reported that the Kroger/Bastiaan group had taken control of the Liberal Victorian Administrative Committee.

In April 2018, Bastiaan was elected metropolitan male vice-president of the Liberal Party (Victorian Division) at the annual State Council. In September 2018 Bastiaan announced that, due to the serious illness of an immediate family member he and his wife Stephanie would step down from their voluntary roles within the party.

In December 2018, The Age newspaper reported leaked text and Facebook messages allegedly from administrative committee members Paul Mitchell and Marcus Bastiaan which used racist and homophobic terms.

Bastiaan has been accused of branch stacking within the party since 2016, and according to some factional sources, causing instability in the party. Bastiaan was believed to be involved in drawing people from religious backgrounds, especially Mormons, to the Liberal Party, despite concern it could harm the Liberals' chances of winning the state election in Victoria in 2018. He was accused of branch stacking and of installing factional operatives in Michael Sukkar and Kevin Andrews’ electorate offices, including to ‘create advertising material for a Liberal Party preselection fight for the state seat of Narracan where Mr Bastiaan's partner, now wife, Stephanie was seeking to defeat incumbent Gary Blackwood.’

In August 2020, allegations were made by Channel Nine's 60 Minutes and The Age Newspaper that Bastiaan was involved in branch stacking activities. Bastiaan's activities were allegedly endorsed by Kevin Andrews and Michael Sukkar, both conservative federal MPs. Andrews, a former Howard Government minister and Sukkar, a current Minister in the Morrison Ministry both denied the allegations. Bastiaan additionally rejected the allegations stating that his role as Chair of the Membership and Training Committee was to recruit and train members. Bastiaan however decided to resign his Party membership, stating that the ongoing leaking was an unnecessary distraction for the Liberal Party. A subsequent Department of Finance investigation into Andrews and Sukkar cleared both Federal Members of misusing taxpayer funds. A second investigation into branch stacking and all aspects of the Liberal Party's membership records was conducted by forensic accountants KordaMentha. The three month investigation made no finding against Bastiaan, Sukkar, or Andrews, though 170 Liberal Party members were expelled from the party due to irregularities uncovered by the audit.

Despite leaving the party, The Age reported he was ‘still active’ in internal Liberal Party politics in 2022.

Personal life
Bastiaan graduated from Brighton Grammar in 2008. He has run several technology businesses, including e-commerce and logistics start-ups.

Bastiaan married Stephanie Ross in May 2017 at Our Lady of Victories Basilica Catholic church in Camberwell.

References 

1990 births
Living people
Businesspeople from Melbourne
People educated at Brighton Grammar School